Großbettlingen is a municipality in the district of Esslingen in Baden-Württemberg in southern Germany.  Großbettlingen is about 5 km from  Nürtingen.  Unlike many small, German villages, Großbettlingen is not administered with any other villages.

Geography

References

Esslingen (district)